Wilms tumor-4 is a protein that in humans is encoded by the WT4 gene.

References